Peter Hertford Drummond (21 August 1931 – 10 December 2013) was an Australian politician. Born in Wagga Wagga, New South Wales, he moved to Western Australia where he farmed at Mount Barker before entering politics.

In 1972, he was elected to the Australian House of Representatives as the Liberal member for Forrest, defeating one-term Labor member Frank Kirwan. He held the seat until his retirement in 1987.

Drummond died on 10 December 2013 in Albany, Western Australia.

References

Liberal Party of Australia members of the Parliament of Australia
Members of the Australian House of Representatives for Forrest
Members of the Australian House of Representatives
1931 births
2013 deaths
20th-century Australian politicians